The Roman Catholic Church in East Africa's major Indian Ocean island state Madagascar comprises only a Latin hierarchy, which is composed of five ecclesiastical provinces, whose Metropolitan Archbisdhoprics have a total of seventeen suffragan dioceses.

There is no Eastern Catholic, pre-diocesan or other exempt jurisdiction.

There is also an Apostolic Nunciature to Madagascar as papal diplomatic representation (embassy-level), in national capital Antananarivo.

There are no titular sees.

All defunct jurisdictions have current successor sees.

Current Latin dioceses

Episcopal Conference of Madagascar

Ecclesiastical Province of Antananarivo
 Metropolitan Archdiocese of Antananarivo
Diocese of Antsirabe
Diocese of Maintirano
Diocese of Miarinarivo
Diocese of Tsiroanomandidy

Ecclesiastical Province of Antsiranana
 Metropolitan Archdiocese of Antsiranana
Diocese of Ambanja
Diocese of Mahajanga
Diocese of Boriziny

Ecclesiastical Province of Fianarantsoa
 Metropolitan Archdiocese of Fianarantsoa
Diocese of Ambositra
Diocese of Farafangana
Diocese of Ihosy
Diocese of Mananjary

Ecclesiastical Province of Toamasina
 Metropolitan Archdiocese of Toamasina
Diocese of Ambatondrazaka
Diocese of Fenoarivo Atsinanana
Diocese of Moramanga

Ecclesiastical Province of Toliara
 Metropolitan Archdiocese of Toliara
Diocese of Morombe
Diocese of Morondava
Diocese of Tôlagnaro.

See also 
 List of Catholic dioceses (structured view)
 List of Roman Catholic dioceses in Indian Ocean Episcopal Conference (Comoros, Mauritius, LaRéunion, Seychelles)

Sources and external links 
 GCatholic.org - data for all sections
 Catholic-Hierarchy entry.

Madagascar
Catholic dioceses